Squalogadus modificatus, the tadpole whiptail, also known as the roundhead tadpole grenadier,  is a species of rattail found in the Atlantic and Pacific Oceans where it occurs at depths of from . This species grows to a length of  TL. It is the only known member of its genus.

References

Marine fish

Gadiformes
Fish described in 1916